Chennam Palli is a village located near Tirupathi Airport. The total population of village is about 500. The map location is Chennampalli, Andra Pradesh 517526.

Villages in Tirupati district